Handia  (Also handi or hadiya) is a rice beer originating from the Indian subcontinent, popular in the Indian states of Jharkhand, Bihar, Odisha, Madhya Pradesh, Chhattisgarh and  West Bengal.

Etmology
Handia comes from hindi word Handi means earthen pot where it was traditionally prepared.

History
Evidence of Fermentation and Alcoholic beverages found in Indus valley civilization during Chalcolithic Period from 3000 BC to 2000 BC in India.
In Ancient India, the Vedas mention a beer-like drink called sura. It was the favourite of the god Indra. Kautilya has mentioned two intoxicating beverages made from rice called Medaka and Prasanna. Megasthenes, the Greek Ambassador to Maurya Emperor Chandragupta Maurya mentioned about rice beer in his book Indica where he mention Indian make wine from rice instead of barley. He mentioned Indian never drink rice wine except during sacrifice.

Preparation
The making involves the use of ranu tablets, which is essentially a combination of about 20-25 herbs and acts as a fermentor. These ranu tablets help in the preparation of many other beverages as well. The ranu tablets are then mixed with boiled rice and left to ferment in earthen pots. The drink is generally ready within a week. It is served cool and has lower alcoholic strength than other Indian country liquors.

Earlier it was only used in marriage function and feast but now it commercialised as people started selling in daily due to economic reasons.

See also
Rice wine
 List of Indian drinks
Related beverages
Amazake
Nigori
Chhaang
Mahuli

References

Further reading

External links

Fermented drinks
Indian alcoholic drinks
Bihari cuisine
Odia cuisine
Jharkhandi cuisine
Types of beer
Traditional Indian alcoholic beverages
Nagpuri culture